Brahmamuhurta (Sanskrit-ब्रह्म मुहूर्त) is a 48-minute period (muhurta) that begins one hour and 36 minutes before sunrise, and ends 48 minutes before sunrise. It is traditionally the penultimate phase or muhurta of the night, and is considered an auspicious time for all practices of yoga and most appropriate for meditation, worship or any other religious practice. Spiritual activities performed early in the morning are said to have a greater effect than in any other part of the day.

Brahmamuhurtha is the 14th muhurtha kala of the night. One muhurtha is a period of 48 minutes, with a whole night consisting of 15 muhurthas. The time of sunrise varies each day, according to geographic location and time of year, and the time of the Brahmamuhurta varies with it. For example, if sunrise is at 6:00 am, the brahmamuhurta begins at 4:24 am and ends at 5:12 am.

In yoga

Ayurveda medicine states that there are three doshas found in the human physical body, called Vata (air and ether), Pitta (fire and water) and Kapha (earth and water). The increase or decrease of these three doshas is related to the cycles of time. From sunrise until 10:00am is the time of Kapha; from 10:00am until 2:00pm is the time of Pitta; and from 2:00pm until 6:00pm (sunset) is the time of Vata.

The evening follows a similar pattern, with the period from 2:00am until 6:00am (sunrise) being Vata time. Brahmamuhurtha occurs during this phase, and yoga masters state that the best time to meditate is one and a half hours before dawn, because the mind is inherently still at that time, enabling one to achieve a deeper meditative state. Yoga teacher Tirumalai Krishnamacharya stated "Think of God. If not God, the sun, if not the sun, your parents." Krishnamacharya identified himself with Vaishnavism, or the worship of bhagwān Vishnu, as did Annanta, under the guidance of Shiva, who is the first yogi. A modern Yogi would then show reverence to the sun.

In the Kali Yuga, divinity can still be reached through yoga, but because of the agitated mind associated with the Yuga, Yoga must be practiced through Kriya, based on asana. It is therefore common for modern yogis whose lineage can be traced to Krishnamacharya to practice the Suryanamaskara, or sun salutation, in the morning. The Suryanamaskara can be used in ritual cleansing practice that uses the mind states associated with 'Vata' in Ayurveda medicine. These mind states are mentioned in Patanjali's Yoga Sutras These qualities are nearer to the divine, as they pertain to stillness of the mind, which allows for the spirit to shine. It is because of the inherently stiller state of mind in Brahmamuhurtha, that meditative states can be more easily achieved.

References

Hindu prayer and meditation
Meditation
Yoga concepts
Time in Hinduism
Night in culture